The fourteenth season of Dancing with the Stars premiered on 30 September 2014. Daniel McPherson had returned to host the season, alongside Edwina Bartholomew. Todd McKenney and Helen Richey returned as judges, alongside Kym Johnson and Adam Garcia. The show received significant promotion using Nathaniel Willemse's song "Live Louder" in the use of its television commercials throughout early September.  AFL player David Rodan won the competition with his pro dancer, Melanie Hooper.

Couples 

The celebrity cast was announced on 28 August, through a News.com.au article. Actor Paul Fenech was originally part of the cast (partnering Alana Patience), but withdrew after he was arrested in September.

Scoring chart

 indicate the lowest score for each week
 indicate the highest score for each week
 the couple eliminated that week
 the returning couple finishing in the bottom two (or three)
 the returning couple that was the last to be called safe
 the winning couple
 the runner-up couple
 the third-place couple

Averages 

*Team dance scores from Week 6 are included in these totals, but Halloween marathon scores from Week 5 are not. The scores from Round 1 on Week 9 are not included as they were not scored on the 40-point scale. Paul Fenech's scores are not included at all.

Highest and lowest scoring performances 
The best and worst performances in each dance according to the judges' 40-point scale are as follows:

These scores have been modified to be out of 40 instead of 30.

Couples' highest and lowest scoring dances

According to the 40-point scale:

Weekly scores
Individual judges scores in the charts below (given in parentheses) are listed in this order from left to right: Todd McKenney, Helen Richey, Kym Johnson, Adam Garcia.

Week 1

Running order

Week 2

Running order

Week 3

Running order

Week 4

Running order

Week 5

Running order

Couples performed one unlearned dance style  with a different partner selected by the general public; no elimination took place.

Week 6

Running order

Week 7

Running order

* Due to Torah being injured, she was replaced by Ash-Leigh Hunter in Team Pop. 
Because of Torah's injury, there was also no elimination this week.

Week 8

Running order

Week 9 - Semi-finals 

Running order

Each semi-finalist was 'mentored' by one of the four judges this week, and this judge was unable to score their corresponding couple in round one.

Week 10 - Grand Final 

Running order

Dance chart 
The celebrities and professional partners danced one of these routines for each corresponding week:
 Week 1:  Cha-cha-cha, Viennese Waltz, Contemporary or Foxtrot
 Week 2:  One Unlearned Dance Introducing Samba, Waltz, Jive, Salsa and Paso doble  (Memorable Moments Week)
 Week 3: One Unlearned Dance Introducing Tango, Viennese Waltz, Quickstep, Rumba and Jazz (Audience Chooses The Songs Week)
 Week 4: One Unlearned Dance (Party Anthems Week)
 Week 5: One Unlearned Dance (Partner Switch-Up Week)
 Week 6: One Unlearned Dance and Marathon Dance (Spooky Halloween Special)
 Week 7: One Unlearned Dance and Team Dances (Rock vs. Pop Week)
 Week 8: Week 5 Dance and One Unlearned Dance (Switch-Up Redo Week)
 Week 9: One Unlearned Dance and One New Style (semi-finals)
 Week 10: Audience's Choice Dance, Judge's Choice Dance & Freestyle (Grand Final)

 Highest scoring dance
 Lowest scoring dance
 Not performed or scored

Reception

Viewership

References

Season 14
2014 Australian television seasons